Vision Australia is a not-for-profit organisation and Australia's largest provider of services for people with blindness and low vision.

Background

Vision Australia was created in 2004 through the merger of 4 smaller blindness organisations: the Royal Victorian Institute for the Blind (RVIB), Vision Australia Foundation (VAF), The Royal Blind Society (RBS), and The National Information Library Service (NILS). At the time Bills needed to be passed through the parliaments of Victoria and New South Wales for this to occur. In 2006 the organisation was further expanded with the merger of the Royal Blind Foundation Queensland. This merger gave it acsess across the eastern states of Australia. In February 2008 it was announced that the Seeing Eye Dogs Australia (SEDA) would also merge with Vision Australia by the end of June 2008. The inclusion of guide dog services means that Vision Australia is able to provide all the services required by the blindness and low vision community.

Facilities 
The Royal Victorian Institute for the Blind building was designed by architects Crouch and Wilson.

The Royal Victorian Institute of the Blind operated a school in Burwood from 1959 to 2009.

Ormond Hall, built in 1891, was originally established as a music hall for the blind and is run by the Royal Victorian Institute for the Blind.

Associated people
Notable staff of the Royal Victorian Institute for the Blind include:
 Hans Roland, wood working teacher
 Ulrich Pfisterer, physical education teacher
 Stanus William Hedger, superintendent and secretary

Life time governors of the Royal Victorian Institute for the Blind include:
 Herbert Taylor
 Jeff Hook

Vice-presidents of the Royal Victorian Institute for the Blind include:
 Alexander Mair

Presidents of the Royal Victorian Institute for the Blind include:
 Jabez Lewis Carnegie
 Frank Nyulasy

Services

The following blindness and low vision services are listed on the Vision Australia website:

Access Advice
Accessible Information Solutions
Audio Description Services
Audio Publishing
Children's Services
Community Education
Deafblind Services
Employment Services (Vision Australia is listed as an official JobAccess Supplier)
Equipment Solutions
Further Education Bursaries
Independent Living Services
Information Library Service
Low Vision Services
Policy and Advocacy
Recreation Services
Technology and Training Solutions
Vision Australia Radio

History and heritage collection

The history of Vision Australia’s founding organisations go back to the late 1800s and cover much of the struggle for better rights and services for Australia's blind and low vision community.

Given this long history, Vision Australia has a very extensive heritage collection including many objects and images pertaining to the story and history of the blindness community in Australia.

Some of the heritage collection can be search and viewed in Victorian Collections

Carols by Candlelight

Vision Australia's Carols by Candlelight is the organisation's leading fundraising and awareness campaign and is an Australian Christmas tradition. Dating back to 1938, it is held on Christmas Eve at the Sidney Myer Music Bowl in Melbourne and reaches a television audience of more than 2 million Australians each year.

All proceeds from this event go towards Vision Australia's Children's Services.

Performers at this event have included Rolf Harris, Hugh Jackman, Tina Arena, John Farnham, Debra Byrne, Olivia Newton-John, Lee Kernaghan, Judith Durham, Marina Prior, Denis Walter, Douglas Heywood, Silvie Paladino, Hi-5, Humphrey B Bear, Mickey Mouse, Anthony Callea and long-time host Ray Martin.

Other supporters of this concert include Myer, Nine Network, Disney, 3AW, Magic 1278 and The Herald Sun.

DAISY

DAISY stands for Digital Accessible Information SYstem. It is a format based on the W3C defined SGML applications XHTML 1.0 and SMIL 1.0. Using this framework, a talking book format is presented that enables navigation within a sequential and hierarchical structure consisting of (marked-up) text synchronized with audio.

Vision Australia is currently in the process of digitising and updating its entire library catalogue to the DAISY format for the benefit of its clients. Vision Australia is listed as a member of the DAISY Consortium.

One of the issues associated with digitising the existing library is managing the massive amounts of computer storage that it will require. At present Vision Australia has a 40-terabyte library that can be scaled to 100 terabytes. Ultimately the organization's goal is to have its library available as online downloads for its community.

E-voting

A win for Vision Australia's Policy and Advocacy department was the introduction of Electronic voting (or E-voting) at the Victoria State Elections in 2007. For the first time in Australian history, people who were blind were able to vote in secrecy and independently. The Victorian Electoral Commission's e-voting system was set up in response to submissions for electoral reform by Vision Australia and Blind Citizens Australia.

Partnerships and memberships

Vision Australia's Information Library Service is listed in the National Library of Australia Catalogue. Vision Australia is also a member of Vision 2020 and the DAISY Consortium.

Vision Australia has signed Memorandums of Understanding with the Canadian National Institute for the Blind (Canada) and the Royal National Institute of Blind People (UK).

Notes and references

External links
Vision Australia Website

Blindness organisations in Australia